Coleophora paraptarmica is a moth of the family Coleophoridae. It is found in Afghanistan, Central Asia and Pakistan.

The larvae feed on Artemisia turanica. They create a leafy case, consisting of several leaf pieces, arranged very irregularly. The caudal end of the case is slightly down-curved, but is sometimes almost straight. The valve is two-sided. The length of the case is 5.5-6.5 mm and it is yellow or light chocolate-brown in color, although the caudal part is much darker and brownish. Larvae can found in the beginning of June and (after diapause) in May.

References

paraptarmica
Moths of Asia
Moths described in 1967